Anacamptis laxiflora (lax-flowered orchid, loose-flowered orchid, or green-winged meadow orchid) is a species of orchid. It has a wide distribution in Europe and Asia as far north as in Germany, and is found in wet meadows with alkaline soil. It grows up to 60 cm high. A. laxiflora is common in Normandy and Brittany (France), but in the United Kingdom it is represented only on the Channel Islands, where it is called Jersey orchid. Notable localities in the Channel Islands include Le Noir Pré meadow in Jersey and several fields at Les Vicheries in Guernsey, where mass blooms of these orchids can be observed from late May to early June.

References

External links 

laxiflora
Orchids of Europe
Orchids of Asia